Basuki Bihari is a big village in the Madhubani district in State of Bihar, India . According to India Population Census 2011 the population of the village is 14385. The majority of people of this village speak in Maithili language. The total area of the village is 13.62 km2. The village is divided into two Gram Panchayat (Village Committee) Basuki Bihari North and Basuki Bihari South. The head of the Gram Panchayat is called as Mukhiya. Mukhiya is elected by adult people of the village. The election of Mukhiya is held by the Election Commission of Bihar state. This village is known for social cultural activities like Durga Puja, Chhath, Kali Puja and Sarswati Puja. The village is connected by State Highway No 75 from Darbhanga to Madhwapur. This village is only two kilometres far from the Indo-Nepal Border at Madhwapur in Madhubani district.

Etymology 
The name of the village is made by two naming words of Lords in Hinduism "Basuki" and "Bihari". Basuki is the name of Lord Shiva. Similarly Bihari is used for symbolising Lord Rama and Krishna and the God in Hinduism. In the village there two old temples of Lord Shiva named as Lord Baba Basuki Nath at the two ends of the village. The first temple is at Basuki Bihari North named Baba Basuki Nath Mahadev Mandir. The second temple of Lord Shiva is at Basuki Chowk in Basuki Bihari South with same naming. In the village there is a place name as Naya Janakpur where Lord Rama temple was built. There is also a Hanuman temple at Naya Janakpur. Therefore the name of the village is originated from the presence of these temples.

Demographics 
As of 2011, the number of families residing in this village is 2913. The total population of the village is 14385, of which 7149 are male while 7236 are females.

The sex ratio of Basuki Bihari village is 1012 females to 1000 males on average. Among children, this ratio is on average 996 females to every 1000 males.

In 2011, the literacy rate of Basuki Bihari village was 52.79%, with literacy among males at 64.48% and 41.29% among  females.

Places of interest 

There are many places in this village which have both religious and historical backgrounds. Some of them are listed below.
 Basuki Nath Mandir is a temple of lord Shiva. Maithil Brahmin were very devoted to lord Shiva. Chaudhary family of Basuki Bihari built this temple in devotion to lord Shiva. The exact date of foundation of the temple is unknown. This is one of the oldest temple in this area. The Pipal tree north to the temple is also a very old tree. At the time of Chhath and Mahashivratri festivals, the temple is richly decorated. A pond, known as Chaudhary Pokhair, is situated in front of the temple.
 Maharani Sthan is a Hindu temple located at Basuki Bihari North village of Madhubani district in Bihar, India. It is very old temple. It is believed that the temple was initially built by Chaudhary family residing in this village. The temple was rebuilt again some years ago. It is the temple of Goddess Bhagwati.
 Sati Mai Sthan is a historical monument built to remember the sacrifice of the life of a Rajput lady Sati in mourning of her husband's martyrdom in a war just after the couple marriage.
 Garhi is a historical site of Rajputs.
 Chaudhary Pokhair is a pond which was built by Chaudhary family of Basuki Bihari North village. Since it is in front of Shiva temple, so this pond is considered as Ganga of this village. Many Hindu religious rituals are performed here. Karma-Kanda rituals of Hindu people are also performed here. It is the most holy pond in the village.

 Shiv Mandir, Bajrang Bazar
 Mahadev Mandir, Shiromanipatti
 Kali Mandir
 Naya Janakpur Mandir is a Hindu temple at outskirt of Basuki Bihari North village of Madhubani district of Bihar, India. It was built by Agyaani Baba of this village in the devotion to Lord Rama.
 Brahm Baba Sthan

Educational Institutions 
In recorded history , the first school established in the village is Primary School Babhnipatti in 1931. This proves that in this village there  was an educational institution before the Independence of India.
 Utkramit Higher Secondary School, Bihari

 Utkramit Middle School, Bihari
 Primary School Babhnipatti, Basuki Bihari
 Delhi Public School, Bihari
 Prerna Academy, Basuki Bihari

Social and cultural organisations 

 "Durga Puja Samiti, Bihari" is a social and cultural organisations to organise Durga Puja festival in the village. It was established in 1987 by the villagers of the village.
 "Kali Puja Samiti, Bihari" organises Kali Puja festival in the village in the month of October - November every year.

Gallery

Environmental Conservation Exhibition 2022

Sarswati Puja 2022

References 

Villages in Madhubani district